Solarium  may refer to:
 A sunroom, a room built largely of glass to afford exposure to the sun
 A terrace (building) or flat housetop
 The Solarium Augusti, a monumental meridian line (or perhaps a sundial) erected in Rome by Emperor Augustus
 A tanning bed or tanning booth, non-medical devices that emit ultraviolet light for the purpose of creating a cosmetic tanning of the skin
 Solarium (constellation), a former constellation
 Solarium (myrmecology), an earthen structure constructed by certain ants for the purpose of brood incubation
 Solarium, a PHP client for interacting with Apache Solr
 Project Solarium, an Eisenhower administration initiative to analyze policy towards the Soviet Union
 Cyberspace Solarium Commission, which works to establish policy solutions to prevent and prepare against cyber attacks.

See also
 Solaria (disambiguation)